Charly Dutournier (born 15 May 1994) is a French professional footballer who plays as a forward for Angoulême. He began his career in the youth team at hometown club Bordeaux before joining Tours in 2011.

Playing career
Dutournier started his career with Bordeaux, but did not make an appearance for either the first team or the reserves and was released by the club in the summer of 2011. He subsequently joined Ligue 2 outfit Tours, where he spent the majority of the 2011–12 campaign in the reserve team before making his professional debut on 11 February 2012, coming on as a late substitute for Billy Ketkeophomphone in the 0–1 defeat away at Istres. Tours manager Peter Zeidler handed Dutournier his first senior start on 3 August 2012 in the opening home match of the 2012–13 season and he scored the equalising goal in the 2–2 draw with Chamois Niortais after goals from Jimmy Roye and Mustapha Durak had given the visitors the lead.

In the summer of 2014, Dutournier left Tours and joined Stade Bordelais in Championnat de France Amateur. After a good season with the club, during which he scored thirteen goals, he signed a two-year deal with Dijon FCO and was immediately loaned out to US Boulogne for the 2015–16 season. The loan was terminated in November, having not given Dutournier the required game time. He was loaned to US Concarneau for the 2016–17 season, with much more success, leading to coach Nicolas Cloarec declaring a wish to secure his services again. Dutournier was loaned to US Avranches for the 2017–18 season, the last of his Dijon contract.

In October 2018, Dutournier rejoined Stade Bordelais. In June 2019 he signed for Villefranche, but after making only one appearance he moved to Stade Briochin in January 2020.

On 27 January 2022, Dutournier moved to Angoulême in Championnat National 2.

Career statistics

References

External links

Charly Dutournier profile at Foot-National.com

 

1994 births
Living people
Footballers from Bordeaux
French footballers
France youth international footballers
Association football forwards
Tours FC players
Stade Bordelais (football) players
Dijon FCO players
US Boulogne players
US Concarneau players
US Avranches players
FC Villefranche Beaujolais players
Stade Briochin players
Angoulême Charente FC players
Ligue 2 players
Championnat National players
Championnat National 2 players
Championnat National 3 players